William Kelso (1872 – 2 January 1956) was a member of the Queensland Legislative Assembly.

Biography
Kelso was born at Busby, East Renfrewshire, Scotland, the son of John Kelso and his wife Catherine (née Marshall). He was educated at the Brisbane Normal School and Brisbane Grammar School and was then a public accountant at Nundah.

On 3 October 1900 he married Elizabeth Freeman (died 1939) in Brisbane and together had one son and one daughter. Kelso died in January 1956 and was cremated at the Mt Thompson Crematorium.

Public life
Kelso, a member of the Queensland United Party, won the seat of Nundah in the Queensland Assembly in 1923. He held it until his defeat by the Labor Party's John Hayes in 1932.

References

Members of the Queensland Legislative Assembly
1872 births
1956 deaths